The 1987 Boston Marathon was the 91st running of the annual marathon race in Boston, United States, which was held on April 20. The elite men's race was won by Japan's Toshihiko Seko in a time of 2:11:50 hours and the women's race was won by Portugal's Rosa Mota in 2:25:21. In the wheelchair race, André Viger of Canada won the men's race in 1:55:42 and Candace Cable of United States won the women's race in 2:19:55. Sinclair Warner of the United States won the men's visually impaired race in a time of 2:51:22.

A total of 5369 runners finished the race, 4576 men and 793 women.

Results

Men

Women

Wheelchair men

Wheelchair women

References

Results. Association of Road Racing Statisticians. Retrieved 2020-07-26.
Boston Marathon Historical Results. Boston Athletic Association. Retrieved 2020-07-26.
1987 Boston Marathon Marathon Wheelchair. Athlinks. Retrieved 2020-07-26.

External links
 Boston Athletic Association website

1987
Boston
Boston Marathon
Marathon
Boston Marathon